The 2006–07 Liga IV was the 65th season of the Liga IV, the fourth tier of the Romanian football league system. The champions of each county association play against one from a neighboring county in a play-off match played on a neutral venue. The winners of the play-off matches promoted to Divizia C.

Promotion play-off
The matches was scheduled to be played on 16 June 2007.

|}

County leagues

Arad County

Bihor County

Brăila County

Covasna County

Galați County

Mureș County

Neamț County

Sibiu County

Suceava County

Vâlcea County

Vrancea County 
Championship play-off 
Quarter-finals

Semi-finals
The semi-finals were played on 31 May 2007 and 3 June 2007.

Final
The championship final was played on 7 June 2007 at Milcovul Stadium in Focșani.

Energia Vulturu won the 2006–07 Liga IV Vrancea County and qualify to promotion play-off in Liga III.

See also 
 2006–07 Liga I
 2006–07 Liga II
 2006–07 Liga III

References

External links
 FRF

Liga IV seasons
4
Romania